Rubén Menini (20 February 1924 – 12 April 2020) was an Argentine basketball player who competed in the 1948 Summer Olympics and in the 1952 Summer Olympics. He became world champion in 1950 with the Argentinian National Team. Menini died in April 2020 at the age of 96.

References

1924 births
2020 deaths
Argentine men's basketball players
Olympic basketball players of Argentina
Basketball players at the 1948 Summer Olympics
Basketball players at the 1952 Summer Olympics
Pan American Games silver medalists for Argentina
Pan American Games medalists in basketball
FIBA World Championship-winning players
Basketball players at the 1951 Pan American Games
Basketball players from Buenos Aires
Medalists at the 1951 Pan American Games
1950 FIBA World Championship players